The Devil Came from Akasava is a 1971 West German-Spanish adventure-spy film directed by Jesús Franco. It was based on a novel by Edgar Wallace called Keeper of the Stone.

The film was shot at the Spandau Studios in Berlin with location shooting in Lisbon and Spain.

Background
The Devil Came from Akasava is based on the short story Keepers of the Stone in the collection Sanders of the River by Edgar Wallace and forming a part of exotic stories on the fictional indigenous people of the Akasava. It is a late example of Edgar Wallace film adaptations that were particularly popular in Germany during the 1960s.

The lead actress Soledad Miranda was killed in a car accident in Portugal soon after finishing this film.

Plot
Prof. Walter Forrester (Ángel Menéndez) is a British scientist working in the Akasava jungle in South America. His assistant finds a mysterious stone but it is stolen and Forrester vanishes, leaving him as the sole suspect. However, after a Scotland Yard detective is murdered while entering Forrester's office in London, the Scotland Yard chief Sir Philipp (Siegfried Schürenberg) hands the case to Jane Morgan (Soledad Miranda), an attractive agent, while given its international priority, Secret Intelligence Service will be on the case. Now, on a secret mission and with double identity as the young stripper wife of the British consul Irving Lambert (Alberto Dalbés), Morgan arrives in South America. Meanwhile, she meets Rex Forrester (Fred Williams), professor's nephew who is also concerned of his fate and arrives in the country for further investigation.

Cast
Soledad Miranda (as Susann Korda): Jane Morgan
Fred Williams: Rex Forrester
Jesús Franco (cameo): Tino Celli
Horst Tappert: Dr. Andrew Thorrsen
Alberto Dalbés: Irving Lambert
Ewa Strömberg: Ingrid Thorrsen
Ángel Menéndez: Prof. Walter Forrester
Siegfried Schürenberg: Sir Philipp
Walter Rilla: Lord Kingsley
Paul Müller: Dr. Henry
Blandine Ebinger: Abigaile Kingsley
Howard Vernon: Humphrey

References

External links

1971 films
West German films
German adventure films
German spy thriller films
Spanish adventure films
Spanish spy thriller films
1970s adventure films
1970s spy thriller films
Films set in South America
Films set in London
Films directed by Jesús Franco
1970s German-language films
Films based on works by Edgar Wallace
Films based on short fiction
Films shot at Spandau Studios
1970s German films